Challenge Airlines IL, formerly CAL Cargo Airlines Ltd., is a cargo airline with its corporate headquarters in Shoam, Israel.

History 
CAL was established in June 1976, starting charter operations in November of that year. Originally, the airline leased aircraft from El Al as required; however, on 1 December 1999, it began operating scheduled services using its own aircraft following receipt of Israeli government licences issued in early 1999.

In 1997, CAL purchased LACHS cargo terminal in Belgium (Liège Airport Cargo Handling Services), which is still fully owned and operated by CAL, and caters to CAL's specialty in nonstandard cargo. In 2010, CAL was purchased privately by Offer Gilboa and expanded its flight operations to include daily flights to and from JFK/TLV.

In 2019, the airline made news headlines for buying a Boeing 747 on Chinese e-commerce website Taobao.com for around US $23,3 million.

Operations

The airline operates daily scheduled cargo flights and charter services carrying nonstandard goods and general cargo internationally. Its main base is Ben Gurion Airport, serving Tel Aviv, and it has a hub at Liège Airport (Belgium). The airline carries approximately 100,000 tons of cargo annually including all categories of nonstandard cargo: temperature-controlled pharmaceutical and healthcare products, live animals, dangerous goods, oversize and overweight cargo, fresh perishable products and valuable goods including fine art.  The company slogan is Challenge accepted.

Destinations 
CAL Cargo Airlines operates freight services to the following scheduled destinations (as of November 2021). Additionally, CAL Cargo Air Lines supplements its own services across the North Atlantic with Challenge Airlines.

Fleet

Current fleet 
The CAL Cargo Air Lines fleet consists of the following aircraft (as of August 2022):

Retired fleet

See also
List of airlines of Israel
Economy of Israel

References

External links

Official website

Airlines established in 1976
Airlines of Israel
Cargo airlines of Israel
1976 establishments in Israel